

GRB 080319B was a gamma-ray burst (GRB) detected by the Swift satellite at 06:12 UTC on March 19, 2008. The burst set a new record for the farthest object that was observable with the naked eye: it had a peak visual apparent magnitude of 5.7 and remained visible to human eyes for approximately 30 seconds. The magnitude was brighter than 9.0 for approximately 60 seconds.
If viewed from 1 AU away, it would have had a peak apparent magnitude of −67.57 (21 quadrillion times brighter than the Sun seen from Earth).

Overview 

The GRB's redshift was measured to be 0.937, which means that the explosion occurred about 7.5 billion years ago (the lookback time), and it took the light that long to reach Earth. This is roughly half the time since the Big Bang. The first scientific paper submitted on the event suggested that the GRB could have easily been seen to a redshift of 16 (essentially to the time in the universe when stars were just being formed, well into the age of reionization) from a sub-meter sized telescope equipped with near-infrared filters.

The afterglow of the burst set a new record for the "most intrinsically bright object ever observed by humans in the universe",
2.5 million times brighter than the brightest supernova to date, SN 2005ap.

Evidence suggests that the afterglow was particularly bright because its gamma jet pointed directly at Earth. This allowed an unprecedented examination of the jet structure, which appears to have consisted of a narrowly focused cone and a wider secondary one. If this is the norm for GRB jets, it follows that most GRB detections only capture the fainter wide cone, which means that most distant GRBs are too faint to detect with current telescopes. This would imply that GRBs are a far more common phenomenon than so far assumed.

A record for the number of observed bursts with the same satellite on one day, four, was also set. This burst was named with the suffix B since it was the second burst detected that day. There were five GRBs detected in a 24-hour period, including GRB 080320.

Until this gamma-ray burst event, the Triangulum Galaxy, at a distance of about 2.9 million light years, was the most distant object visible to the naked eye. The galaxy remains the most distant permanent object viewable without aid.

It was soon suggested that this spectacle be named the Clarke Event, as it first reached Earth just hours before the death of Arthur C. Clarke.

The plot below shows the brightness in both the optical and at higher energy for the event. The first optical exposure started about 2 seconds before the source was first observed by the SWIFT telescope and lasted for 10 seconds. The emission in both curves then peaks at around 60 seconds before a long exponential decay.

See also 
 GRB 080916C

References

Citations

Database references

External links 

 Hubble Pinpoints Record-Breaking Explosion
 SkyWatch Show 165: Brightest Explosion Ever Seen -(mp3)
 AAVSO Alert Notice 372 Possible naked-eye gamma-ray burst detected (GRB 080319B)
 ESO Press Release

080319B
Boötes
20080319